Mengoub is a town in the Sahara Desert of North-eastern Morocco near the border with Algeria.

Populated places in Béchar Province